Salvador Gómez may refer to:

Salvador Gómez (water polo) (born 1968), former water polo player from Spain
 Salvador Videgain Gómez (1845–1906), Spanish actor, singer, producer and composer
Salvador Gómez, former mayor of Nizao in the Dominican Republic
Salvador Gómez-Colón (born 2002), youth activist from Puerto Rico